Gregory "Gigi" Gonaway is an American drummer and percussionist, born in Phoenix, Arizona. His father, Eldridge Gonaway was an attorney and city developer and his Mother, Lois (née Warrior) is a retired registered nurse. Gonaway has been making music since the 1970s and has played drums on recordings with artists such as Whitney Houston, Aretha Franklin, George Benson, Natalie Cole, and Steve Winwood
among others and toured extensively with Mariah Carey and Clarence Clemons.

He was a protégé of Narada Michael Walden's in the 1980s and 1990s and worked at Tarpan recording studio with Walden on most of the major label acts he produced.  Walden was an established music producer and drummer and took Gonaway under his wing as he said he reminded him of himself when he was a young drummer just starting out. Gonaway attributes much of his success to Walden.

Early Years
Gonaway began playing drums at ten years old. His parents relocated from Arizona to the San Francisco Bay Area in California where he attended a Catholic high school, Saint Mary's College High School where he learned to read, write, and arrange music under the guidance of Bob Barrett and played in the school's jazz band.

Gonaway's first band was called Sapphire and they played the nightclub scene in Oakland. Later he formed the jazz fusion band, Iz Kidz who performed regularly in the San Francisco Bay Area.

While performing in the jazz fusion band, Iz Kidz in Oakland, California, Gonaway was introduced to Narada Michael Walden who took an interest in his drumming skills and shortly afterwards Walden hired him at his recording studio. Walden would later open Tarpan studio in San Rafael, California.  Part of Gonaway's job was running errands and providing transportation to recording artists to and from the recording studio. Before long Walden was teaching him how to create beats on the drum machine and letting him play drum tracks on albums with Aretha Franklin and George Benson.

Session Work and Touring
Walden mentored Gonaway in many areas of his musicianship including becoming a more diverse drummer developing programming skills and understanding the importance of production in the studio. Eventually, Gonaway was participating in Walden's recording projects for projects including recording artists Aretha Franklin, George Benson, Kenny G, George Michael and others.

Mariah Carey
In early 1990, Mariah Carey and producer Walter Afanasieff formed the original Mariah Carey band, which included Gonaway, Randy Jackson, Vernon Black, Ren Klyce, Dan Shea (producer), Peter Michael Escovedo and engineer Dana John Chappelle.  Gonaway's first televised performances with Carey were on The Arsenio Hall Show and later on her controversial appearance on Oprah on which she discussed her racial makeup.  Gonaway toured with Carey from 1990-2005.

The Aaron Hendra Project
Gonaway began playing drums with singer-songwriter, Aaron Hendra in 2009 which would later be named The Aaron Hendra Project.

Hendra is married to reality TV actress, Tiffany Hendra of The Real Housewives of Dallas. Tiffany organized a charitable event on at The House of Blues in Dallas, Texas, where Gonaway performed with The Aaron Hendra Project, at the Light Up Tomorrow event to raise funds that were used to build state-of-the-art off grid solar farms in the various East African orphanages, schools and facilities.  The project was built and managed by Sam Childers, the Machine Gun Preacher, through the Angels for East Africa organization.  The live performance aired in Season 1, Episode 7 on The Real Housewives of Dallas.

Hendra and Gonaway also appeared in the romantic comedy film, Slightly Single in L.A. in 2013, performing live as The Aaron Hendra Project.

Film Appearances
Gonaway appeared in the Whitney Houston music video, I Get So Emotional playing percussion in 1987 and in Mariah Carey's MTV Unplugged (Mariah Carey EP) live recording as Carey's drummer in 1992. Aaron Hendra and Gonaway appeared in the quirky romantic comedy, Slightly Single in L.A. in 2013 and on Bravo (U.S. TV network)'s The Real Housewives of Dallas in 2016 performing live as The Aaron Hendra Project.

Product Endorsements
Drum Workshop (DW)
Remo Drumheads
Vic Firth
Paiste

Discography
2017 - Scorpio - Blaine Long - drums
2016 -  Elvis Monroe - Elvis Monroe - drums
2014 - Face the Music - Nils Lofgren - drums
2013- Octobersong - The Aaron Hendra Project - drums
2012 - Knew You Were Waiting: The Best of Aretha Franklin 1980-1998 - Aretha Franklin - percussion
2009 - The Collection 2009 - Whitney Houston - electronic percussion
2007 - Best When Lived (Life Is) - Greg Johnson - producer, drums, percussion
2006 - Destination You - Linda Imperial - drums, percussion
2005 - Favorites 1990-2005 - Nils Lofgren - drums
2004 - Kathi McDonald - Kathi McDonald - drums
2004 - Very Best of George Benson: The Greatest Hits of All - George Benson - drums, cymbals, and percussion
2003 - The Greatest Hits of All  - George Benson - drums, cymbals, and percussion
2002 - Life and Love - Philip Bailey - drums, writer
2000 - The George Benson Anthology - George Benson - cymbals, electronic percussion
1998 - Best Kept Secret - Positive ID - drums, percussion
1998 - Phoenix Rising - The Temptations - cymbals
1998 - VH1 Divas Live - drums
1997 - Junction Seven - Steve Winwood - MIDI drums, percussion   
1995 - Chill - Lenny Williams - producer, arranger, drums, percussion
1995 - The Best of George Benson (Warner Bros.) - George Benson - cymbals
1994 - Greatest Hits: 1980-1994 - Aretha Franklin -  percussion
1992 - MTV_Unplugged_(Mariah_Carey_EP - Mariah Carey - drums 
1991 - Time, Love and Tenderness - Michael Bolton - timbales  
1991 - Retrogroove Artifact - Rhythmtown Jive - percussion
1991 - Silver Lining - Nils Lofgren - drums
1990 - It's Supposed to Be Fun - Lou Rawls - percussion   
1989 - Stay With Me - Regina Belle - drums - gold record
1989 - D'Atra Hicks - D'Atra Hicks - cymbals
1989 - Good to Be Back - Natalie Cole - cymbals
1989 - Night with Mr. C - Clarence Clemons - cymbals, percussion, performer, primary artist
1989 - So Happy - Eddie Murphy - percussion    
1989 - Through the Storm - Aretha Franklin - percussion, cymbals
1989 - Pia Z - Pia Zadora - cymbals, percussion
1987 - Whitney - Whitney Houston - percussion
1986 - Aretha 1986 - Aretha Franklin -  percussion, vocals (background)
1986 - Duotones - Kenny G - drums, percussion
1986 - Frantic Romantic - Jermaine Stewart - percussion, electronic drum fills
1986 - While the City Sleeps - George Benson - synthesizer, drums, cymbals, percussion, drum fills
1985 - Hero - Clarence Clemons & the Red Bank Rockers - percussion
1985 - Who's Zoomin' Who? - Aretha Franklin - percussion
1980 - Aretha 1980 - Aretha Franklin - percussion
1980 - Life Is Good - Jimmy Mac - drums

References

External links
 https://www.allmusic.com/artist/greg-gigi-gonaway-mn0001710849/credits

American drummers
American male drummers
Living people
Year of birth missing (living people)